Dium or Dion or Dia (Δία) was a city in ancient Coele-Syria mentioned by numerous ancient writers. According to Stephanus of Byzantium, the city was a foundation of Alexander the Great, and named after the city Dium in Macedon. It was also called Pella.

Location
Dium is sometimes identified with Tell el-Ash'ari from the Daraa Governorate in southwestern Syria (see :fr:Tell al-Achari at French Wikipedia).  Some associate Dium with the later Capitolias, now Beit Ras in Jordan.

The location of Dium is not proven with certainty. According to Ptolemy, the city was southeast of Pella, which is now in modern Jordan, and quite close to it; but its latitude was quite uncertain. Josephus in his retelling of Pompey's march through the area, says he came from Damascus via Dium to Pella, thus putting Dium to the north of Pella.

Historical sources
Stephanus notes that the city's water was unhealthy. Little is known about the history of the city. Like most of the Hellenistic cities in that region, it was subjugated to the Jews under Alexander Jannaeus, who conquered the town, which was then conquered by Pompey and its freedom restored in 62 BCE. The coins of Dium are from the Pompeian era. Pliny the Elder and Ptolemy count the city as among the Decapolis.

References

Populated places in Coele-Syria
Former populated places in Jordan
Former populated places in Syria 
Hellenistic colonies
Cities founded by Alexander the Great
Roman towns and cities in Syria
Roman towns and cities in Jordan
Lost ancient cities and towns
Decapolis